Alexandrian laurel is a common name for several plants and may refer to:

Calophyllum inophyllum, native to tropical Asia
Danae racemosa